is a Japanese volleyball player, a member of the Japan men's national volleyball team, a gold medalist of the 2017 Asian Championship.

Sporting achievements
 National championships
 2014/2015  Japanese Championship, with Toyoda Gosei Trefuerza
 2015/2016  Finnish Cup, with Kokkolan Tiikerit
 2015/2016  Finnish Championship, with Kokkolan Tiikerit

 National team
 2012  Asian Cup
 2013  Summer Universiade
 2017  Asian Championship
 2019  Asian Championship

Individually
 2016: Finnish Championship – The Most Valuable Player

References

External links
PlusLiga profile
Worldofvolley profile
Volleyball-Movies profile

1989 births
Living people
People from Sasebo
Sportspeople from Nagasaki Prefecture
Japanese men's volleyball players
Expatriate volleyball players in Poland
Japanese expatriates in Poland
Universiade bronze medalists for Japan
Universiade medalists in volleyball
Warta Zawiercie players
Liberos